Scott MacKenzie (born 7 September 1970) is a Scottish professional football player and coach. During his career he played for Falkirk (twice), St Mirren, Hamilton Academical and Queen of the South. MacKenzie is currently working for Albion Rovers as their assistant manager.

External links 

1970 births
Living people
Footballers from Glasgow
Association football midfielders
Scottish footballers
Falkirk F.C. players
St Mirren F.C. players
Hamilton Academical F.C. players
Queen of the South F.C. players
Scottish Football League players